Los Alamos High School (LAHS) is the public high school in Los Alamos, New Mexico, USA. The school opened in 1946, and was originally supported by the Atomic Energy Commission. It has been academically recognized by Newsweek, U.S. News & World Report, and the New Mexico Public Education Department. The school has been visited by two U.S. Presidents: John F. Kennedy and Bill Clinton. LAHS currently competes in the New Mexico Activities Association's District 2, AAAA division for athletics, and has won 111 state championships in the school's history.

History

Los Alamos High School was the second high school built in Los Alamos. Prior to the Second World War, the Los Alamos Ranch School functioned as a boarding school for wealthy easterners that combined elements of a college preparatory school with a rugged frontier life. In 1942 Los Alamos was chosen to be the site of the Manhattan Project. The US Government acquired the property of the Ranch School through eminent domain, and the school was shut down in 1943.

During wartime, structures in Los Alamos were temporary because people were expecting to leave after the wartime project was completed. In August 1945, following the Allied victory in Japan, it was decided the Los Alamos Laboratory's nuclear research would continue in order to counter a rising Soviet threat. In 1946 Los Alamos begin erecting permanent structures, including Los Alamos High School. Life during the war and post-war transition was difficult for the first students of LAHS. "'[We were] normal teenagers trying to have a normal life in very adverse conditions," said Dan Nelis, one of the school's original students.

In 1946, much of the budget for construction and operation of the high school was provided directly by the Atomic Energy Commission instead of state or local taxes. This arrangement persisted under the Department of Energy and Washington has traditionally paid for a third of the school system's budget. Support from the federal government has been declining and was only 22% in the 2008–2009 academic year.

During the 1960s, LAHS began to attract attention for its consistent academic performance, low drop-out rate, and innovative teaching methods. President John F. Kennedy noted LAHS and other local schools during his visit to Los Alamos in 1962: "I've admired from some years ago, from reading an article about the kind of schools that you run here and the kind of boys and girls that you're bringing up." In 1964, after the assassination of President Kennedy, the community of Los Alamos erected a permanent memorial in his honor at the high school football field.

President Bill Clinton spoke at the school in 1993. In Clinton's speech, he marked the community's technological contributions to national security, and envisioned a new Post-Cold War role for the town in promoting technological advancement and prosperity.
 In October 1995 a delegation of nuclear scientists from Sarov (Los Alamos's Russian sister city) visited Los Alamos to celebrate the 50th anniversary of the Allied Victory in WWII and the end of the Cold War. During their visit members of the delegation both attended and taught classes at Los Alamos High School and the University of New Mexico, Los Alamos. Clinton made an unscheduled appearance at LAHS in 1998 following a speech he gave at the Los Alamos National Laboratory. After passing students who had gathered to cheer his motorcade on his way to the speech, Clinton returned to greet the students and play saxophone.

In 2000, two students were killed before daylight on Good Friday while making a traditional religious pilgrimage to El Santuario de Chimayó. On May 10 many students lost their homes in the Cerro Grande Fire. The blaze also devastated the scenic forests and hillsides surrounding the school.

The school was used as a filming location for the 2010 film Let Me In, the American remake of the Swedish film Let the Right One In. Students from LAHS and the surrounding community participated as extras in the cast.

Academics

Los Alamos High School's academic achievements have been recognized by a number of national publications. LAHS was ranked #780 out of 2,000 in Newsweek magazine's 2013 America's Best High School list. Los Alamos High School received "Silver Medal" ranking in 2013 as one of America's Best High Schools in an announcement by U.S. News & World Report on April 24, 2013. From a review of 21,035 U.S. public high schools, Los Alamos ranked 556th in the nation. Los Alamos ranking was up significantly from the 2012 "Silver Medal" ranking of 638th. LAHS was awarded a silver medal in U.S. News & World Reports Best High School Search 2008. In 2005 LAHS was named one of the "1,000 Best High Schools in America" (#649) by Newsweek Magazine. In 1998, LAHS was identified as a top performing public high-school in Class Struggle, a book by Washington Post education reporter Jay Mathews examining the public education system in America. The strength of LAHS's academic record has been associated
 with the academic nature of Los Alamos County, which has the highest concentration of PhDs per capita in the United States. LAHS is not a magnet school and does not have an admissions exam; Any student living in Los Alamos is free to attend. Every year students from LAHS students are recognized for the achievements by the National Merit Scholarship Program, the National Hispanic Recognition Program, and the College Board's AP Scholar awards.

LAHS does not rank students, arguing that a focus on rank by potential universities can cause many excellent students to be overlooked. The GPAs of top students at LAHS are separated from each other by thousandths of a point.

63% of LAHS faculty have earned an advanced degree.

LAHS is accredited by the North Central Association of the New Mexico State Department of Education. The Department of Education frequently awards LAHS with an "Exemplary" rating for its academics. LAHS has consistently exceeded the Adequate Yearly Progress Math and Reading proficiency requirements of the No Child Left Behind Act for its student body at large. However, LAHS has sometimes failed to meet the requirements of AYP due to inadequate test scores among students with disabilities or insufficient participation of Caucasian students.

{| class="wikitable collapsible collapsed"
|+
! colspan="6" style="text-align:center;" bgcolor=""|AYP Testing Results
|-
! School Year !! Proficiency Math (Goal) !!  Proficiency Reading (Goal) !! School Rating !! Designation !!Reason if AYP not met
|-
| 2010–11 || 79.01% (53%) || 84.02 (64%) || Not Met || SI-2 || Insufficient Math Proficiency among Students with Disabilities (24.14%)
|-
| 2009–10 || 66.30% (46%) || 77.50% (60%) || Not Met || SI-1 || Insufficient Participation rate of Caucasian Students for AYP Math Test (93%) Insufficient Math Proficiency among Students with Disabilities(22.2%)
|-
| 2008–09 || 69.50% (40%) || 73.50% (56%) || Not Met || SI-1 || Insufficient Math and Reading Proficiency among Students with Disabilities (17.1% and 20.0% respectively)
|-
| 2007–08 ||  ||  || Meets AYP || None ||
|-
| 2006–07 || 75.31% (22%) || 79.01 (41%) || Meets AYP || None ||
|-
| 2005–06  ||  ||  || Meets AYP ||
|-
| 2004–05 || 89.00% (35%) || 92.00% (44%) || Not Met ||  || Insufficient Participation rate of Caucasian Students for AYP Reading Test (94%)
|}

Curriculum
The Los Alamos High School has a standards-based curriculum and allows students to develop an individualized four-year plan. Advanced Placement (AP) courses are offered in German, Spanish, French, physics, biology, chemistry, calculus, statistics, English, American history, European history, psychology, and computers. Students also participate in NJROTC, educational work study, a building trades program, an automotive program, marketing and office technology courses, and concurrent enrollment at the University of New Mexico's Los Alamos Branch Campus which is located adjacent to the high school. Students who desire a different approach to education can apply to the School of Choice, a project-oriented, cooperative learning, interdisciplinary program. Comprehensive special education programs are available at all levels including work study and vocational training. Work-related courses for credit include student assistant and student intern (stipend), which involve work on campus; MAPS (Mentorship, Apprenticeship, Partnership), which places students in the community (credit only); and Co-op Work Experience, which employs students throughout the community.

Student body

Los Alamos High School is a suburban high school serving the entire county of Los Alamos, including White Rock, although some students from neighbouring counties attend as well. The median household income in Los Alamos County is $88,870 and few economically disadvantaged students attend LAHS. Elsewhere in New Mexico, LAHS is sometimes characterized as a school for the "rich". Most of the students at LAHS originate from Los Alamos Middle School, the only middle school in Los Alamos County.

Ethnic composition
 White, not Hispanic: 77%
 White, Hispanic: 17%
 Asian/Pacific Islander: 4%
 Indian/Alaskan Native: less than 1%
 Black, not Hispanic: less than 1%

Extracurricular activities

Athletics

Los Alamos High School competes in the New Mexico Activities Association District 2-AAAA. Since its transition from a AAA to a AAAA school in 2000–2001, the students of LAHS have won over 30 state titles in competitive high school sports. LAHS was honored with the AAAA Girls all-sports trophy in 2000–01, 2001–02, and 2003–04. In 2003–04 LAHS also received The "New Mexico Athletic Director of the Year" award.

{| class="wikitable collapsible"
|+
! colspan="2" style="text-align:center;" bgcolor=""|Athletic Classification / District Alignment
|-
! LAHS Athletic Districts
! Year:
|-
|2-A
|1954–1967
|-
|1-AA
|1968–1969
|-
|1-AAAA
|1970–1992
|-
|2-AAA
|1993–2000
|-
|2-AAAA
|2001–2014
|-
|2-AAAAA Football
|2014-present
|-
|2-AAAA Other sports
|2018-present
|}

Cross country
In 2007, the LAHS Boys Cross Country team (competing as the Los Alamos XC Club) placed second at the 2007 Nike Cross Nationals. The LAHS Boys Cross Country team also participated in the Nike Cross Nationals in the 2006 season. In 2002 the LAHS Girls Cross Country, won the AAAA State Championship with a perfect score of 15 (i.e. their runners finished in places 1–5). The LAHS Girls Cross Country Team participated in the inaugural Nike Cross Nationals championship in the 2004 season.

State championships
LAHS has won over 110 state championships in athletics, the third-most number of state titles won by any high school in New Mexico.

{| class="wikitable collapsible collapsed"
! colspan="4" style="text-align:center;" bgcolor=""|Table of State Championships
|-
! style="width:25px;"|Season !! Sport !! style="text-align:center;"|Number of Championships !! style="text-align:center;"|Year
|-
| rowspan="6"| Fall || Football || style="text-align:center;"|1 || 1966
|-
| Boys' Cross Country  || style="text-align:center;"|9 || 2003, 2007, 2011, 2012, 2013, 2014, 2018, 2019, 2021
|-
| Girls' Cross Country || style="text-align:center;"|23 ||1981, 1982, 1992, 1994, 1995, 1996, 1997, 2000, 2001, 2002, 2003, 2004, 2006, 2009, 2010, 2011, 2012, 2013, 2014, 2015, 2019, 2020, 2021
|-
| Boys' Soccer || style="text-align:center;"|2 || 1986, 2010
|-
| Girls' Soccer|| style="text-align:center;"|6 || 1981, 1983, 1985, 1987, 1998, 2003
|-
| Volleyball|| style="text-align:center;"| 3|| 1987, 1995, 1996
|-
| rowspan="5"|Winter || Boys' Basketball|| style="text-align:center;"|2 || 1964, 2000
|-
| Girls' Basketball || style="text-align:center;"|0 ||
|-
| Boys' Swimming || style="text-align:center;"|18 ||1956, 1971, 1974, 1976, 1977, 1978, 1979, 1980, 1981, 1982, 1983, 1984, 1987, 1988, 1990, 1991, 2004, 2005
|-
| Girls' Swimming || style="text-align:center;"|15 || 1970, 1972, 1976, 1977, 1978, 1979, 1980, 1981, 1982, 1984, 1985, 1988, 1992, 1993, 2004
|-
| Wrestling || style="text-align:center;"|0 ||
|-
| rowspan="9"| Spring || Baseball  || style="text-align:center;"|2 ||1966, 1978
|-
| Cheerleading|| style="text-align:center;"|0 ||
|-
| Boys' Golf || style="text-align:center;"|6 || 1969, 1996, 2004, 2005, 2006, 2019
|-
| Girls' Golf|| style="text-align:center;"| 3 || 1984, 2007, 2019
|-
| Softball|| style="text-align:center;"| 0 ||
|-
| Boys' Track|| style="text-align:center;"|5 || 1965, 1995, 2008, 2021, 2022
|-
| Girls' Track|| style="text-align:center;"|8 || 1995, 2003, 2009, 2010, 2011, 2012, 2021, 2022
|-
| Boys' Tennis|| style="text-align:center;"| 0 ||
|-
| Girls' Tennis|| style="text-align:center;"|8 || 2000, 2001, 2002, 2003, 2004, 2007, 2008, 2013
|-
| colspan="2" style="text-align:center;"|Total || style="text-align:center;"|111(Ranked 3rd in state)||
|}

Music

LAHS directs several musical groups, many of which are offered for academic credit. These groups include a Marching band, Jazz Band, Symphonic Band, Wind Ensemble, Four Choirs (2 Women's, 2 Co-ed), and a Symphonic Orchestra. The LAHS Topper Marching Band won first place in their category at the tournament of the bands in 2006 and 2008, swept Pageant of Bands in 2008, won first place in their category at Zia Marching Band Festival in 2009. The Concert Band has taken home state titles most recently 2008, 2009, and 2011. All four LAHS choirs received superior ratings at the District Large Group Festival in 2009 Schola Cantorum, the top choir at LAHS, won the state championship for choir in 2015. This was the first choir in the state to beat Piedra Vista High School's PVC Pipes, who had won the state championship every year since state competitions for choir began in New Mexico.

Other clubs and organizations
 Los Alamos High School has an active Science Bowl Club. The club won the New Mexico Regional competition in 2010, 2011, 2012, 2013, 2014, 2016, 2017, 2018, 2019, and 2020. Each of these years, the team progressed to the national competition in Washington D.C. In 2012, they became the first team from New Mexico to make it out of the national round robin round, finishing in a tie for 9th.
 LAHS literary magazine, Pegasus 2004, was "Recommended for Highest Award" in the 2004 NCTE Program to Recognize Excellence in Student Literary Magazines.
 In 2012 LAHS's NJROTC Unit was designated a "Distinguished Unit With Honors" for the ninth year in a row. This designation included academic honors, which are reserved for only a handful of units.
 The Hilltalkers, the competitive speech and debate team coached for many years by Paul Black, won numerous State Championships in Cross-Examination Debate, Extemporaneous Speaking and Original Oratory.
 The 1985 chess team tied for 2nd place in the US National Championships held in St. Louis.

Team Name and Mascot

The team name, Hilltoppers, derives from a popular nickname for the city, "The Hill." Sometimes LAHS students are referred to with the abbreviation Toppers or 'Toppers.

The team colors of forest green and gold reference the autumnal display, on the mountains behind the town, of dark-green pine forest interspersed with bright yellow aspen.

The mascot of Los Alamos High School is the Hilltopper, chosen in a vote by the student body in the 1960s. (Previously, the school teams were iconified by a top-hat and gloves). In 1980 a mural of the Hilltopper was painted in Griffith Gymnasium. In this mural the Hilltopper was prominently depicted as a rugged Mountain Man with a walking stick atop the scenic Jemez Mountains that overlook LAHS. In 2004, the mural was destroyed during renovations to the Gymnasium's HVAC system when a series of fans were installed on the gym's interior south wall.

Facilities

In 2010, construction began on the high school to replace aging buildings at the center of the campus. A-D wings were torn down to make room for a new three-story building. The new main building was completed in late 2011 with classes beginning in January 2012. This is the most recent in a series of capital renovations at the high school including the addition of a new science wing and the newly remodeled R-Wing (formerly the cafeteria). In 2010 Los Alamos Public Schools were commended by Energy Education for their efforts in promoting energy efficiency. LA Schools achieved over a million dollars in energy cost savings during a 56-month period.

Notable alumni
 Walt Arnold (class of 1976), NFL tight end
 Lynn Bjorklund (class of 1975) National High School record 3000 meters, USA National Cross Country Champion in 1974 and 1975.
 Carol Cady, (class of 1980) two time competitor in the Olympic games: shot put in 1984, discus in 1988. Held US Women's discus record for 21 years.
 Clayborne Carson (class of 1962), civil rights activist and professor of history at Stanford University 
 Susann Cokal, (class of 1982) novelist
Chase Ealey, (class of 2012) 2019 indoor and outdoor, 2020 indoor national champion in women's shot put. Qualifier for the World Athletics Championships.
 Drew Goddard (class of 1993), screenwriter and a co-executive producer of Lost.
 Kolinda Grabar-Kitarović (class of 1986), 4th President of the Republic of Croatia.
 Kevin Johnson (class of 1978), President and CEO of Starbucks.
 Alex Kirk, (class of 2010) professional Basketball player for the Canton Charge.
 Kim Paffenroth, (class of 1984) author, winner of the Bram Stoker Award for horror writing.
 Steven Preeg (class of 1989), 81st Academy Award for Best Visual Effects for The Curious Case of Benjamin Button.
 Carl Quintanilla, (Class of 1988), American journalist working for CNBC. He is co-anchor and anchor, respectively, of CNBC's morning programs Squawk on the Street and Squawk Alley, both of which broadcast live from the floor of the New York Stock Exchange.
Harriet Ruiz, (class of 1959) member of the New Mexico House of Representatives from 2004 to 2006.
 Anthony Sandoval, winner of the 1980 U.S. Olympic Marathon trials, Olympic hopeful for the boycotted Moscow Olympics.
 Andy Thoma, (class of 2011) professional soccer player for the Portland Timbers.
 Terry C. Wallace, Jr. (class of 1974) The 11th Director of Los Alamos National Laboratory and current president of Los Alamos National Security, LLC.
Nelson Martinez, co-anchor of KOAT's Action 7 News from 1985 to 2002, then was a co-anchor of KOB's Eyewitness News 4 from 2004 to 2005.

References

External links

 LAHS website: https://laschools.net/lahs/
 LAHS Alumni website: http://www.losalamosalumni.com/

 

Educational institutions established in 1946
Public high schools in New Mexico
High School, Los Alamos
Schools in Los Alamos County, New Mexico
Buildings and structures in Los Alamos County, New Mexico
1946 establishments in New Mexico